Ariolasoft GmbH, later known as United Software, was a German video game developer, publisher and distributor. It started in 1983 as the software subsidiary of Ariola Records, itself the record division of Germany's large Bertelsmann empire. From 1985-1988 Stephen Molyneux, formerly Head of Software at Atari International GmbH in Hamburg, held the position of Head of Software with responsibility for international negotiations and licensing of software at its headquarters in Munich. Ariolasoft also had a British subsidiary, Ariolasoft UK, which was run by Ashley Gray (later replaced by Willie Carminke) and Frank Brunger.

The company released games for the ZX Spectrum, Commodore 64, MS-DOS, Atari 8-bit, Atari ST and Amiga systems. It was also the German publisher for Activision games developed for the Atari 2600, and the European publisher for Electronic Arts and Broderbund games, before those companies set up their own European offices. Ariolasoft also developed the cassette ports of those titles, and also developed original games. In addition to software activities, they were also the German distributor of the Master System between approximately 1987 and 1988.

In 1990, the company was renamed United Software, which in 1993 was taken over by MicroProse Germany.

Original games

Collaborations
''Cavelord with Atari Germany

References

Defunct video game companies of Germany
Video game companies established in 1983
Video game companies disestablished in 1993
Video game development companies
Video game publishers
1983 establishments in West Germany
German companies established in 1983
MicroProse
German companies disestablished in 1993